Hackenthorpe Hall is a 17th-century manor house located in Hackenthorpe, Sheffield, England. The building dates back to 1653, and was built by John and his wife Alice Newbould, and was the historic residence of the Hounsfield family thereafter.

History
The Hall was built in 1653 by John Newbould and his wife Alice, their initials as well as the year is carved in stone above the main entranceway. The Newbold family was present in the village for centuries prior, with Alice's great-granduncles son Michael Newbold emigrating to the United States in the 17th century. In 1875, James Hounsfield restored and extended the building. Although little remains of the original structure, the datestone above the door was preserved and still remains.

Today the Hall is used as a children's daycare and nursery.

References

Houses completed in 1653
Country houses in South Yorkshire